Chris Mullin is an American former professional basketball player. 

Chris Mullin may also refer to:

Chris Mullin (politician) (born 1947), English politician, novelist and diarist

See also
Christopher Mullane, New Zealand Army lieutenant colonel, ONZM MBE, 1979 US Legion of Merit 
Christopher Mullins (born 1986), Australian Paralympic cerebral palsy track and field athlete